Events in the year 1858 in Belgium.

Incumbents
Monarch: Leopold I
Head of government: Charles Rogier

Events

 24 May – Provincial elections
 17 July – New commercial treaty agreed with the United States.
 2 August – Bourse of Antwerp burns down.
 September – International congress on intellectual property held in Brussels.

Publications
Periodicals
 Almanach de poche de Bruxelles (Brussels, Tircher)
 Annales de pomologie belge et étrangère, vol. 6.
 Annuaire de la noblesse de Belgique, vol. 12, edited by Isidore de Stein d'Altenstein
 Annuaire statistique et historique belge, vol. 5, edited by Auguste Scheler
 Annuaire de l'Académie royale de Belgique, vol. 24
 La Belgique, 5
 La Belgique Horticole, vol. 8.
 Bulletin et annales de l'Académie d'archéologie de Belgique, vol. 5
 Bulletins de l'Académie royale des sciences et belles-lettres de Bruxelles, vol. 5 (Brussels, Hayez).
 Collection de précis historiques, vol. 7, edited by Edouard Terwecoren S.J.
 Journal de l'armée belge, vol. 15
 Journal d'horticulture pratique de la Belgique

Official reports and monographs
 Recueil consulaire contenant les rapports commerciaux
 Recueil des lois et arrêtés royaux de la Belgique, vol. 10

Other works
 C. H. Barlet, Géographie industrielle et commerciale de la Belgique (Mechelen, E.-F. van Velsen)
 Hendrik Conscience, De omwenteling van 1830 (Antwerp, J. P. van Dieren)
 Alexandre Henne, Histoire du règne de Charles-Quint en Belgique (Brussels and Leipzig, Émile Flatau)
 Jan van Ruusbroec, Dat Boec van den gheesteleken Tabernacule, edited by Jean-Baptist David, 2 volumes (Ghent, Maetschappy der Vlaemsche Bibliophilen).
 Jean-Joseph Thonissen, La Belgique sous le règne de Léopold I, vol. 4 (Liège, J.-G. Lardinois)
 Alphonse Wauters, Bruxelles et ses faubourgs: guide de l'étranger (Brussels, C. W. Froment)

Births
 8 April – Eugène van Rechem, bishop (died 1943)
 16 April – Philippe Wolfers, jeweller (died 1929)
 7 May – Charles Liebrechts, explorer (died 1938)
 21 June – Léon Roget, colonial officer (died 1909)
 12 September – Fernand Khnopff, painter (died 1921)
 19 October – George Albert Boulenger, zoologist (died 1937)
 4 November – Jacques de Lalaing, artist (died 1917)

Deaths
 22 February – Noël Delfosse (born 1801), politician
 14 March – Henri Guillaume Galeotti (born 1814), botanist and geologist
 22 April – François Joseph Ferdinand Marchal (born 1780), archivist
 29 April – Charles d'Hane de Steenhuyze (born 1787), politician
 15 May – Jacques Coghen (born 1791), politician
 27 June – Coralie van den Cruyce (born 1796), writer

References

 
Belgium
Years of the 19th century in Belgium
1850s in Belgium
Belgium